Southaven High School is a public secondary school located in Southaven, Mississippi, United States. 
It began in the fall of 1971, when construction was completed enough so that students could start the first classes. The original school taught 6th through 12th.

History 
Southaven High school was originally built in 1972. The building it was originally built added a junior high in 1996. In 2004, the citizens of Southaven, MS voted to build a new high school (where is currently located) and make where the high school was a middle school. The new facility was finished in fall of 2006, and classes started in 2007 at the new building.

Athletics
Males and females have their own teams for basketball, soccer, track, cross country, bowling , and golf. Only males can play football and baseball. Volleyball, softball, and color guard are restricted to females. Tennis and cheer leading are co-ed sports offered at Southaven.

Performing and Visual Arts 
The Southaven High School Theatre program performs a play during the fall and a musical during the spring. The other performing and visual arts courses offered are Class Piano, Music Appreciation, AP Studio Art, AP Art History, Ceramics, Photography, and General Art.

Demographics 

As of the class of 2022- 2023, Southaven High school has 1,758 students, %55 of students are black, %28 are White, %9 are Hispanic, %2 are Asian, and %6 are multiracial.

Notable alumni
Carl Byrum - American Football Player
Terence Davis - Professional Basketball Player in the NBA for the Sacramento Kings and NCAA Division I basketball player for Ole Miss Rebels men's basketball.
John Grisham - Author
Reagan Rust - Professional Hockey Player in the PWHPA and NCAA Division I women's ice hockey captain for Boston University
Brandin Echols - American Football Player
 Terry Williams - American Football Player

References

External links
 

Public high schools in Mississippi
Southaven, Mississippi
Schools in DeSoto County, Mississippi
1971 establishments in Mississippi
Educational institutions established in 1971